The 2022–23 Maine Black Bears men's basketball team represented the University of Maine in the 2022–23 NCAA Division I men's basketball season. The Black Bears, led by first-year head coach Chris Markwood, played their home games at Cross Insurance Center in Bangor, Maine, with some games at Memorial Gymnasium in Orono, Maine, as members of the America East Conference.

Previous season
The Black Bears finished the 2021–22 season 6–23, 3–15 in America East play to finish in last place. As a result, they failed to qualify for the America East Tournament.

On February 17, head coach Richard Barron was dismissed as the Black Bears' head coach, with assistant coach Jai Steadman serving as the interim head coach for the remainder of the season. On March 21, the school announced that alumnus and former Maine assistant coach Chris Markwood was named the school's new head coach.

Guarantee games
Prior to the season, Maine scheduled 5 "guarantee games" with a power conference school. In these games, the home team pay the road team a set amount of money. Maine will receive a total of $365,000 for these five games (Nebraska, Boston College, Marist, Akron, and Ohio State).

Roster

Schedule and results

|-
!colspan=12 style=| Non-conference regular season

|-
!colspan=12 style=| America East Conference regular season

|-
!colspan=12 style=| America East tournament

Sources

References

Maine Black Bears men's basketball seasons
Maine Black Bears
Maine Black Bears men's basketball
Maine Black Bears men's basketball